The Diolite Kinen (in Japanese: ダイオライト記念), is a Domestic Grade 2 horse race for four-year-olds at Funabashi Racecourse.

Race details
The first edition of the race took place on March 15, 1956.

The race has been held in March since its inception.

The race is named after the racehorse, Diolite.

Winners since 2015
Winners since 2015 include:

Past winners
Past winners include:

See also
 Horse racing in Japan
 List of Japanese flat horse races

References

Funabashi
Horse racing in Japan